Otarioidea is a superfamily of pinnipeds that includes the families Odobenidae, Otariidae and their stem-relatives. In the past when the pinnipeds were considered to be a diphyletic group of marine mammals, a few points of cranial and dental morphology suggested that the otarioids originated from a line of bears. One extinct family, Enaliarctidae, was postulated to be otarioids that were a transitional clade between Hemicyoninae (an extinct subfamily of dog-like bears) and Otariidae. Recent comprehensive studies have, however, since the 1990s found pinnipeds to be a monophyletic clade of aquatic arctoids. There are a few authorities that place desmatophocids and odobenids as sister taxa to Phocidae in the clade Phocomorpha based on a few minor physiological features.

References

Pinnipeds
Extant Burdigalian first appearances
Taxa named by John Edward Gray